The 1956 Moomba TT was a motor race for open and closed sports cars, staged at the Albert Park Circuit in Victoria, Australia on 11 March 1956. 
It was the second Moomba TT, with a similar race having been run at Albert Park in 1955.
Contested over 150 miles, it was the feature race on the first day of a two-day race meeting which was conducted on the two Sundays of Melbourne's Moomba Festival. 
The meeting was organised by the Light Car Club of Australia for the Argus Moomba Motor Races Committee.

The race was won by  Tony Gaze driving a HWM Jaguar.

Results

Notes
 Attendance: 100,000
 Start: Le Mans type
 Starters: 37
 Race time: 1-49:04 (83.5 mph)
 Fastest lap: Tony Gaze, Bib Stillwell & Stan Jones: 2:10 (86.5 mph)

Notes & references

External links
 Speed thrilled 100,000, The Argus, Monday, 12 March 1956, page 5, trove.nla.gov.au
 Car Racing (results), The Argus, Monday, 12 March 1956, page 13, trove.nla.gov.au

Moomba TT
Motorsport at Albert Park
March 1956 sports events in Australia